The 1985 Florida Citrus Bowl was the 40th held. It featured the BYU Cougars and the Ohio State Buckeyes.

Background
Both teams were ranked coming into the Citrus Bowl, with BYU playing in their eighth consecutive bowl game.  The Cougars appeared in nine more before the streak ended in 1994. Ohio State was playing their second bowl game in 1985, having played in the 1985 Rose Bowl, in their 14th consecutive bowl season, that streak that ended in 1987. Robbie Bosco had 338 of 511 passes for 4,273 yards and 30 touchdowns for BYU, and finished third in Heisman Trophy voting. The game was to be predicted to be high scoring affair.

Game summary
The game was anything but high scoring for the offense. BYU lead at halftime 7–3 after Robbie Bosco threw a touchdown pass to David Miles. Ohio State's offense could only muster a field goal by Rich Spangler late in the half. But it was in the third quarter when the game turned around for Ohio State. BYU was deep in their own territory at the 11-yard line when Bosco threw an interception to Larry Kolic, who returned it 14 yards for a touchdown and a 10–7 lead. BYU had three chances to rally in the fourth quarter, but were stopped each time. Their last drive went 50 yards (in 46 seconds), but with 10 seconds remaining, Bosco threw his fourth interception of the day, this time to Terry White. Bosco went 26 for 50 with only 261 yards in a game that saw eight combined turnovers.

The game was also known for an acrobatic sideline catch by Ohio State receiver Cris Carter caught a ball, one-handed, on a pass quarterback Jim Karsatos was meaning to throw away. Karsatos has claimed that catch by Carter was the greatest in the history of college football: "When I finally saw it on film, he was tiptoeing the sidelines and he jumped up and caught the ball left-handed by the point of the football at least a yard out of bounds. Then he somehow levitated back in bounds to get both his feet in bounds. I swear to this day he actually levitated to get back in bounds. When I saw it on film, it just blew me away."

Statistics

References

Florida Citrus Bowl
Citrus Bowl (game)
BYU Cougars football bowl games
Ohio State Buckeyes football bowl games
Florida Citrus Bowl
Florida Citrus Bowl